Farm to Market Road 149 (FM 149) is a farm to market road in the U.S. state of Texas.

Route description
FM 149 has a southern terminus in Pinehurst at the former north end of  SH 249, where that road (prior to December 2019) transitioned into  FM 1774 toward Magnolia. The route travels north through unincorporated Montgomery County before entering the city of Montgomery, where it crosses  SH 105. FM 149 then passes to the west of Lake Conroe and enters the Sam Houston National Forest, where it begins to turn to the west. The highway crosses into Grimes County, where it is signed as a west–east route, and passes through Richards before turning to the southwest. In the county seat of Anderson, FM 149 has a one-block concurrency with  SH 90 before resuming its westward course.

Spur route
FM 149 has one spur route, FM Spur 149, in Montgomery County.

History
FM 149 was created on April 20, 1945 as a short spur between Anderson and Richards inside Grimes County. Later that year, it was extended twice, to the Montgomery County line on June 6, 1945 and to Deckers Prairie ten days later. The designation was extended down the Tomball Road to US 75 (later  I-45) in Houston on July 22, 1949. On October 31, 1957, the route was extended beyond Anderson to its current western terminus at  FM 244 (now FM 3090). The section from FM 2430 (now West Montgomery Road) to US 75 was transferred to  FM 2430 on December 10, 1959, while FM 149 was rerouted north over the former route of FM 2430. A spur connection to  FM 1488 was added on November 1, 1968 which replaced the old route of FM 149 because one section of the old route was transferred to FM 1488. The road was truncated to its current length on October 28, 1988, when the section from the southern terminus at Interstate 45 to  FM 1774 was transferred to  SH 249.

Major intersections

References

0149
Transportation in Montgomery County, Texas
Transportation in Grimes County, Texas